Amel Baladiet Mérouana, known as AB Mérouana or simply ABM for short, is an Algerian Football club based in Merouana in Batna Province. The club was founded in 1933 and its colours are yellow and black. Their home stadium, Stade Abderrahmene Bensaci, has a capacity of 10,000 spectators. The club is currently playing in the Ligue Nationale du Football Amateur.

References

External links
Official blog

Football clubs in Algeria
Batna Province
Association football clubs established in 1933
Algerian Ligue 2 clubs
1933 establishments in Algeria
Sports clubs in Algeria